Kolya (also Romanized as Kolyā; also known as Keyā and Kīā) is a village in Shohada Rural District, Yaneh Sar District, Behshahr County, Mazandaran Province, Iran. At the 2006 census, its population was 103, in 34 families.

References 

Populated places in Behshahr County